Open Hospital 

OH - Open Hospital is a free and open-source software Electronic Health Record (EHR) software application.

Open Hospital is deployed as a desktop application that can be used in a standalone, single user mode (PORTABLE mode) or in a client / server network configuration (CLIENT mode), where multiple clients and users connect to the same database server.

OH is developed in Java and it is based on open-source tools and libraries; it runs on any computer, requires low resources and is designed to work without an internet connection.

Open Hospital is the first of a set of software applications that ISF - Informatici Senza Frontiere has developed to support the information management and the activities of hospitals and health centers in the simplest manner possible, by providing tools for the administrative operations (like registering patients, manage laboratory analysis and pharmaceutical stocks) and to produce detailed statistics and reports.

It was first deployed in 2006 at the St. Luke's Hospital, Angal, in Nebbi District, Northern Uganda.  and it is now used in dozens of different locations around the world.

When OH is used in PORTABLE mode, it is easily possible to move the installation on another computer or even run it from a USB stick or drive. All you have to do is to copy the root installation directory of OH to your favourite folder, where the program and all the data are kept.

OH uses its own version of the Java Virtual Machine (JRE) and the MariaDB/MySQL server.

OH is released under the GNU GPL 3.0 License.

project for hospitals in poor and rural areas. It was developed by Informatici Senza Frontiere for use at Other hospitals have since adopted the software.

History 
Informatici Senza Frontiere ("IT Without Borders") was formed in 2005 after a discussion between an Italian doctor working at St. Luke's Hospital, Angal, a small rural hospital in northern Uganda, and a group of Italian IT managers about the importance of computer technology even in remote areas where to have drinkable water, medicines and competent doctors might seem a higher priority. After a few months of work by Roberto Carrer and his students at a technical school in the Veneto, an application for the hospital was ready; it was delivered in 2006.

References 

Free health care software
Electronic health record software
Healthcare software for macOS
Healthcare software for Windows
Healthcare software for Linux